Aleksandr Laktionov may refer to:

 Aleksandr Ivanovich Laktionov (1910–1972), Socialist realism painter in the post-war Soviet Union
 Aleksandr Laktionov (footballer) (born 1986), football midfielder from Russia